The Quebec-Wallonia-Brussels Agency for Youth (in French, "agence Québec Wallonie Bruxelles pour la jeunesse") (AQWBJ) is a semi-public international relations body that offers young people from Quebec, aged 18 to 30 years, the opportunity to gain experience in other countries through various programs involving missions and training courses in Wallonia and Brussels.

The AQWBJ has collaborated with the Parlement Jeunesse du Québec.

External links
 Quebec-Wallonia-Brussels Agency for Youth (in French)

Youth organizations based in Canada